Icahn: The Restless Billionaire is an HBO documentary written, produced and directed by Bruce David Klein. It is an Atlas Media Corp Production.

The documentary examined the life and deals of the self-made billionaire Carl Icahn, including interviews with Icahn, and commentary, interviews and anecdotes from business journalists, Icahn’s family, and personalities offering insight on how Icahn became one of the richest people in the world.

Icahn: The Restless Billionaire explores the deals of eBay, Texaco, TWA, Apple, Herbalife, and Netflix, among others. The documentary addresses the presumed succession by Icahn’s son, Brett Icahn – and includes appearances by Bill Gates, Oliver Stone and journalists Andrew Ross Sorkin, Rana Foroohar, Scott Wapner and Brian Burrough.

The film premiered on HBO on February 15, 2022 and became available to stream on HBO Max.

References

External links 

2022 films
2022 documentary films
American documentary films
American business films
Documentary films about economics
Films shot in New York City
HBO documentary films
Trading films
Wall Street films
2020s English-language films
2020s American films